Chawk Bazaar is a bazaar in Chowkbazar Thana, Old Dhaka, Bangladesh. It dates back to the Mughal period.

Shai Mosque

Chowk Bazaar Shai Mosque was built in 1676. This three domed mosque was made by Shaista Khan. Made on 10 feet high platform, 94 feet length and 80 feet width. It was divided among the shops from the ancient times and it was maintained by the shop rents. The mosque was built according to the rules of Shaista Khan and nearby places. After lot of time of innovation it lost its appeal Dhaka's noble people came to pray here.
It was written:

References

 Dhaka Smriti Bismriti'r Nagari by Mumtasir Mamun.Published by Bangla Academy, Dhaka, Bangladesh. 
 
 

Old Dhaka
Bazaars in Bangladesh
Economy of Dhaka
Buildings and structures in Dhaka
Neighbourhoods in Dhaka
Tourist attractions in Dhaka
Economic history of Bangladesh